This article is about the particular significance of the year 2018 to Wales and its people.

Incumbents

First Minister – Carwyn Jones  (until 12 December), Mark Drakeford (starting 13 December) 
Secretary of State for Wales – Alun Cairns
Archbishop of Wales – John Davies, Bishop of Swansea and Brecon
Archdruid of the National Eisteddfod of Wales – Geraint Llifon
National Poet of Wales – Ifor ap Glyn

Events

January

16 January – Controversial Assembly member Neil McEvoy is expelled from the Plaid Cymru group in the Welsh Assembly, with the statement that "His ongoing behaviour has left assembly member colleagues feeling undermined and demoralised".
30 January – In his trial at Woolwich Crown Court, Darren Osborne claims to have had assistance in carrying out the 2017 Finsbury Park attack and reveals links with Welsh far-right groups.

February
1 February – Darren Osborne is convicted of murder for the 2017 Finsbury Park attack and is sentenced to life imprisonment.
6 February – 2018 Alyn and Deeside by-election: Jack Sargeant wins the by-election for the National Assembly for Wales constituency of Alyn and Deeside, triggered by the death of his father, incumbent Labour AM Carl Sargeant.
17 February – Cwmllynfell is the epicentre of a 4.4 magnitude earthquake, the biggest in the UK for ten years.

March
1 March – Storm Emma causes widespread disruption in Wales, with heavy snowfall and strong winds in many places and the Met Office issuing a red warning and the public being advised to stay indoors if possible.
29 March – UK prime minister Theresa May visits South Wales as part of a nationwide tour in the run-up to Brexit.

April

4 April – Swimmer Jazz Carlin carries the Welsh flag at the opening ceremony of the 2018 Commonwealth Games, where Wales fields a team of 214 athletes, competing in 16 sports.
23 April
At the conference of the Wales Labour Party, First Minister Carwyn Jones announces that he will stand down later in the year.
Catherine, Duchess of Cambridge, gives birth to a son, a third grandchild for Charles, Prince of Wales.

May
6 May - Cardiff City Football Club gain promotion to the Premier League, after results go their way on the final day of the football season.
11 May – The short list for the Wales Book of the Year award for 2018 is announced. Contenders in the various categories include Thomas Dilworth, Gwyneth Lewis, Peredur Lynch, Robert Minhinnick and Mihangel Morgan.
19 May – Prince Harry of Wales, younger son of the Prince of Wales, is created Duke of Sussex on his wedding day.

June
7 June – James Howell & Co, Cardiff's oldest surviving department store, is earmarked for closure by its owners, House of Fraser.
8 June – Welsh names mentioned in the Queen's 2018 Birthday Honours include novelist Ken Follett (CBE), scientist Graham Hutchings (CBE), astronomer Haley Gomez (MBE) and Paralympic athlete Menna Fitzpatrick (MBE).
22 June – The state government of Meghalaya announces that 22 June, the date of Thomas Jones's arrival at Sohra, will be celebrated as "Thomas Jones Day" every year.
27 June – Andrew R. T. Davies announces his resignation as leader of the Conservative group in the Welsh Assembly.

July

29 July – Cardiff cyclist Geraint Thomas becomes the first Welshman ever to win the Tour de France, finishing in 83h 17' 13".

August
3 August - the "fence-free" National Eisteddfod of Wales opens in Cardiff Bay.
10 August – AM Gareth Bennett is elected leader of UKIP in the Welsh Assembly.
13 August – New UKIP Assembly leader Gareth Bennett is criticised by First Minister Carwyn Jones and other Assembly members for supporting Boris Johnson in his criticism of Moslem women's dress.

September
6 September – Paul Davies is elected the new leader of the Conservative opposition in the Welsh Assembly.
10 September – Leanne Wood, campaigning for re-election as leader of Plaid Cymru, claims that the other candidates, Adam Price and Rhun ap Iorwerth, would be prepared to "strike a deal with the Conservatives".
28 September – Adam Price wins the election to be the new leader of Plaid Cymru; he supports the idea of a second referendum on Brexit.

October
5 October – In a speech at the Plaid Cymru annual conference, new leader Adam Price states that independence for Wales should be considered following Brexit.

November
28 November – First Minister Carwyn Jones gives evidence at the inquest into the death of AM Carl Sargeant.

December
3 December – "Gwenwyn", by Alffa, becomes the first Welsh language single to achieve one million plays on Spotify.
6 December – Mark Drakeford wins the Welsh Labour Party leadership election to become the Welsh Labour Party's new leader and front runner to take over the job of First Minister of Wales from the incumbent Carwyn Jones.
12 December – Mark Drakeford is elected First Minister for Wales, with 30 Assembly members' votes.
19 December – BBC Wales reveals the results of research, showing that Wales is receiving less benefit than some individual districts of London from the National Lottery Fund. Oswyn Hughes, head of campaigns for the National Lottery in Wales, says there are "a number of reasons" for the difference.
28 December – Welsh recipients of New Year's Honours are named; they include Geraint Thomas (OBE), Mike Peters (MBE), athlete Helen Jenkins (MBE) and former cricketer Matthew Maynard (MBE).

Arts and literature

National Eisteddfod of Wales
Chair – Gruffudd Eifion Owen
Crown – Catrin Dafydd
Prose Medal – Manon Steffan Ros 
Gwobr Goffa Daniel Owen: Mari Williams

Welsh Awards
Wales Book of the Year 2018
English language: Robert Minhinnick, Diary of the Last Man
Welsh language: Goronwy Wynne, Blodau Cymru: Byd y Planhigion

New books

English language
Malcolm Nash – Not Only, But Also: My Life in Cricket  
Meic Stephens – Rhys Davies – A Writer's Life

Welsh language
Daniel Davies – Arwyr
Geraint Evans – Digon i'r Diwrnod
Llwyd Owen – Pyrth Uffern
Manon Rhys – Stafell fy Haul

Music

New albums
Phil Campbell and the Bastard Sons – The Age Of Absurdity
Manic Street Preachers – Resistance Is Futile

New compositions
 Paul Mealor – Symphony No 3: Illumination
 Huw Watkins – Spring

Film
Eternal Beauty, written and directed by Craig Roberts, filmed in Wales and co-starring Robert Pugh.
Gwen, starring Eleanor Worthington Cox, produced by Hilary Bevan Jones.

Television
A Discovery of Witches, filmed on location in Wales and at Cardiff's Bad Wolf Studios, premiers of Sky One.

Visual arts
18 December – Banksy mural Season's Greetings appears in Port Talbot.

Sport

In sports
Association football
15 January – Ryan Giggs is named as manager of the Wales national football team, succeeding Chris Coleman, who left the position in November 2017.
3 November – Cardiff City F.C. lose at home to Leicester City F.C. in the visiting side's first match since the death of their owner, Vichai Srivaddhanaprabha, in a helicopter crash one week earlier.
Horse racing
6 January – the postponed 2017 Welsh Grand National is run at Chepstow Racecourse and won by Raz De Maree. The winner is ridden by 16-year-old James Bowen, who becomes the youngest jockey to win the race.
27 December – Elegant Escape, ridden by Tom O'Brien and trained by Colin Tizzard, wins the 2018 Welsh Grand National at Chepstow.
2018 Winter Olympics
18 February – Wrexham's Laura Deas wins a bronze medal in the skeleton at the 2018 Winter Olympics in Pyeongchang, South Korea.
2018 Commonwealth Games
5 April – Para-cyclist James Ball wins Wales's first medal of the Games, a silver in the men's B&VI 1,000m time trial.
6 April – Cyclist Lewis Oliva wins silver in the men's Keirin, while Gareth Irfon Evans wins Wales's first gold of the Games in the Men's 69 kg.
9 April – Wales win a further three golds, two silvers and a bronze to surpass the medal total from the previous Commonwealth Games.
2018 Tour de France (road bicycle racing)
29 July – Geraint Thomas is overall winner.
Snooker
7 May – Mark Williams wins the World Snooker Championship for the third time by defeating John Higgins 17–15 in the final.

Awards
12 December – Geraint Thomas wins the BBC Sports Personality of the Year Award.

Broadcasting

English-language television
Charlotte Church and Rhod Gilbert are among celebrities who participate in BBC Wales documentaries about mental health issues, linked to the "Welsh Happiness Day" project.
Keeping Faith, the English-language version of Un Bore Mercher, is aired on BBC Wales.
BBC Wales launches a "Festival of Funny" for the month of October, including the new series Tourist Trap, starring Sally Phillips.

English-language radio
Jamie Owen's Wales

Welsh-language television
Craith (7 January)

Welsh-language radio
The BBC launches a new station, Radio Cymru 2, opening with presenters Dafydd Du and Caryl Parry Jones.

Deaths
4 January – Ray Thomas, 76, musician of Welsh extraction
7 January – Bryn Crossley, 59, jockey
11 January – Ednyfed Hudson Davies, 88, politician, MP for Conway (1966–1970) and Caerphilly (1979–1983). (death announced on this date)
25 January – Keith Pring, 74, Welsh international footballer
29 January – Alfred Gooding, 85, entrepreneur
1 March – Beth Morris, 74, actress
15 March – Gwilym Roberts, 89, politician
17 March – Nicholas Edwards, Baron Crickhowell, 84, former Secretary of State for Wales
18 March – Ivor Richard, Baron Richard, 85, politician and diplomat, Lord Privy Seal (1997–1998) and former ambassador to the UN
21 April – Les Pearce, rugby league player and coach, 94
23 April – Barrie Williams, football coach and manager, 79
1 May – Peter Temple-Morris, Baron Temple-Morris, politician, 80
13 May – Gareth Powell Williams, rugby union player, 63
14 May – Abdulrahim Abby Farah, Welsh-born Somali diplomat and politician, 98
18 June – Frank Vickery, playwright, 67
29 June – Helen Griffin, actress, playwright and screenwriter, 59
1 July – Julian Tudor Hart, doctor and politician, 91
3 July – Meic Stephens, journalist and critic, 79
23 July – Haydn Morgan, 81, rugby player
9 August – Arthur Davies, operatic tenor, 77 (death announced on this date)
12 August – Betty Gray, table tennis player, 96.
1 September – Kenneth Bowen, operatic tenor, 86
5 September – Rachael Bland, journalist and presenter, 40 (breast cancer)
16 September – Tommy Best, footballer, 97
2 October – Ceri Peach, 78, geographer
10 October – Denzil Davies, 80, politician, MP for Llanelli (1970–2005).
19 November – John Mantle, 76, Wales rugby union and rugby league international.

References

 
2010s in Wales
Years of the 21st century in Wales
Wales